John A. Adam (born in 1949) is an American writer and editor based in Washington, D.C.

Adams' work includes the profiling of various leaders in science and technology, including Internet pioneers Bob Kahn and Vint Cerf, pacemaker inventor Wilson Greatbatch, and earth scientist Marcia McNutt. He has also conducted investigative reports on cryptography, stealth aircraft, arms control verification, Brazil's power, and the Gulf War.

Adams' journalism accomplishments include publications in Scientific American, ARTnews, Discover, The New York Times, and The Washington Post. During his tenure as a staff writer at IEEE Spectrum, he received four National Magazine Awards honours: Public Service in 1993; finalist in 1988; and special issues in 1986 and 1990.

References

American foreign policy writers
American male non-fiction writers
Living people
1949 births
20th-century American journalists
American male journalists